Concert at the End of Summer is 1980 Czechoslovak historical biographical film. The film consists pictures from life of Antonín Dvořák.

Plot
Antonín Dvořák prepares for Concert at Royal Albert Hall but bad feeling forces him to return to his homeland. While in a train, Dvořák remembers his life. He remembers when he started 15 years ago as a violinist in a Theatre. He was impressed by young actress Josefina Čermáková but she married count Kounic while Dvořák married her sister Anna. Dvořák the got into conflict with Kounic's brother Kent which almost cost him career. But support from his wife Anna and help from influential composer Brahms helps him succeed. His conflict with Kent continues as Kent orders a composition from him that he would release as his own but Dvořák manages to get rid of the contract. Dvořák returns to Prague where he is greeted by his family.

Cast
 Josef Vinklář as Antonín Dvořák
 Jana Hlaváčková as Anna Dvořáková
 Jana Hlaváčová as Josefina Čermáková
 Svatopluk Beneš as Count Kounic
 František Němec as Kent
 Vlasta Fabianová as Countess Eleonora
 Jiří Bartoška as Kent's Messenger
 Zlata Adamovská as Otylka
 Ondřej Pavelka as Josef Suk
 Václav Lohniský as Band Master
 Ondřej Havelka as Student called Fénix
 Ladislav Bambas as Oskar Nedbal

Reception

Accolades

References

External links
 

1980s historical drama films
1980 films
Czech historical drama films
1980s Czech-language films
Czechoslovak drama films
Films directed by František Vláčil
Antonín Dvořák
1980 drama films
Films about composers